Chamaita is a genus of moths in the subfamily Arctiinae. The genus was erected by Francis Walker in 1862. Species are distributed throughout India, Sri Lanka, and Borneo.

Description
Palpi slight and porrect (extending forward). Antennae very long with thickened basal joint. Tibia with short spurs. Forewings with hairy and highly arched costa. In forewings, vein 3 from before angle of cell, vein 5 from near center of discocellulars and vein 6 from below upper angle. Veins 7 and 8 stalked, vein 9 absent and vein 11 not anastomosing (fusing) with vein 12. Hindwings with vein 3 before angle of cell, vein 5 from above angle, veins 6 and 7 stalked and vein 8 from middle of cell.

Species

References

External links

Nudariina
Moth genera